Blood of Brothers: Life and War in Nicaragua is a 1991 book by Stephen Kinzer, an American author and The New York Times foreign correspondent who reported from Nicaragua during the Sandinista-Contras civil war period of the 1980s.

Publishing information
 Blood of Brothers: Life and War in Nicaragua, by Stephen Kinzer, Putnam Publishing Group, 1991.  (reprinted in 2007 by the David Rockefeller Center for Latin American Studies, Harvard University)

Books about Nicaragua
Non-fiction books about war
Books by Stephen Kinzer
1991 non-fiction books